Cnemaspis harimau, also known as the tiger rock gecko, is a species of gecko endemic to Malaysia.

References

Cnemaspis
Reptiles described in 2010